Entarisi ala benziyor,(),(),(),(),() is a form of the Balkan folk dance karşılama. Entarisi ala benziyor is a folk dance spread all over Greece, Turkey, Armenia and Albania.

Βranches of tune
There are modern popular versions of this song, with Turkish lyrics, known as "Aşkla Pazarlık Olmaz", one sung by Gökben.

See also 
 Greek dances
 Albanian dances
 Aranjman 2011

References

Greek music
Macedonia (Greece)
Turkish dances
Albanian folk dances
Greek dances
Pomak dances
Macedonian music
Armenian dances
Domna Samiou songs
Songwriter unknown
Year of song unknown